Hecho Aragonese, or Cheso, is a Western Aragonese variety spoken in the Hecho Valley of Northern Aragon.

Filiation 
Hecho Aragonese is one of Western Aragonese's most preserved varieties and it could be said that Cheso Aragonese, along with Aragüés Aragonese, is just one of several varieties of the language.

Sociocultural aspects

Geographical situation 
Cheso Aragonese is spoken within Hecho Valley, in 'La Jacetania' county, Hecho being its main village.

Social situation 

It is the Western Aragonese variety that has its most defined features in comparison to other dialects. Today it is one of the most vital Aragonese dialects and it has been estimated that there are 658 speakers: 526 in Hecho and Ciresa villages and 132 neighbors that live outside of the valley itself.

Literature 

Cheso Aragonese has been one of the modern Aragonese dialects with the most literary production. Among its most famous writers, we find Rosario Ustáriz.
One of the most famous texts in Cheso Aragonese is the song "S'ha feito de nuey", written by Pepe Lera and published in the magazine Fuellas, edited by Consello d'a Fabla Aragonesa (FUELLAS, nº 20, nov-dec 1980).

See also 
Aragonese dialects

Aragonese dialects